Clyde Mitchell Shoun (March 20, 1912 – March 20, 1968) was an American professional baseball player. A left-handed pitcher, he was born in Mountain City, Tennessee, and known as "Hardrock", due to his fastball. He was the younger brother of professional basketball player Slim Shoun.

Shoun was 23 years old when he broke into the big leagues on August 7, 1935, with the Chicago Cubs. He played for the Cubs, Cincinnati Reds, St. Louis Cardinals, Boston Braves, and Chicago White Sox.

Shoun led the major leagues in games pitched with 54 in 1940 when he was a member of the Cardinals.

While with the Reds, Shoun no-hit the Boston Braves 1–0 on May 15, 1944. The lone baserunner came on a walk to his mound opponent, Jim Tobin, himself a no-hit pitcher just 18 days earlier on April 27, and well known for being a good-hitting pitcher.

Shoun missed the 1945 professional baseball season due to his service in the Navy during World War II. However, he continued to play baseball during the year while in the service.

Shoun died on his 56th birthday in the veterans center in Johnson City, Tennessee.

See also
 List of Major League Baseball annual saves leaders
 List of Major League Baseball no-hitters

References

External links

1912 births
1968 deaths
Baseball players from Tennessee
Birmingham Barons players
Boston Braves players
Chicago Cubs players
Chicago White Sox players
Cincinnati Reds players
Indianapolis Indians players
Major League Baseball pitchers
Oakland Oaks (baseball) players
People from Mountain City, Tennessee
St. Louis Cardinals players
United States Navy personnel of World War II